Cormocephalus aurantiipes is a common species of centipede found throughout Australia, often confused with C. westwoodi. It can be found in every Australian state except Tasmania and the Northern Territory. Like most centipedes it comes in many different "colour forms", depending on locality.

External links 

aurantiipes
Centipedes of Australia
Animals described in 1844